The Bachelor's Beat was a paid-circulation, tabloid-style weekly newspaper published in Las Vegas, Nevada, United States.
Its content centered on local events, bands and clubs. It also contained editorials and commentary critical of local politicians.

The paper started in 1964 (several years before the much larger New Times got their start). The Beat, as it is referred to, was initially distributed free in bars and restaurants. The newsrack price was 25 cents.

The newspaper's founder was Jerry Jay Evenson, author of the book Break The Rules And Win, Surviving AIDS and Other Disasters  and When All Else Fails, R.T.D.D. (Read The Damn Directions)

The Bachelor's Beat is no longer published, and, its domain names are up for sale.

References

Defunct newspapers published in the United States
Publications established in 1964
Publications disestablished in 2008
Newspapers published in Las Vegas